Deeside Stadium is a multi-sport stadium located in Connah's Quay, Deeside. It is the home stadium to Welsh Premier League side Connah's Quay Nomads as well as Deeside Athletics Club.

History 

The stadium was opened in 1998 and became home to Connah's Quay who moved from their previous venue, the Halfway Ground.

In 2006, the Nomads spent time playing at Flint Town's Cae-Y-Castell ground as the pitch at Deeside underwent renovations. Shortly afterwards, they began planning to move into a new purpose built ground, although these plans never came to fruition.

Layout 

The stadium features one raised stand containing 500 seats. Lying next to it is a small disabled shelter. Opposite the stand is a two-storey media centre and TV gantry.

Attendances 

Connah's Quay's record attendance at the Deeside Stadium is 1,068 for the Scottish Challenge Cup Semi Final game against Edinburgh City F.C.

References

Football venues in Wales
Stadiums in Wales
Sports venues completed in 1998
Connah's Quay Nomads F.C.